Albert James Kelley (March 1, 1902 – July 5, 1963) played in three seasons with the Duluth Kelleys/Eskimos of the National Football League. He was a running back and halfback.

References

Sportspeople from Superior, Wisconsin
Players of American football from Chicago
Players of American football from Wisconsin
Duluth Kelleys players
Duluth Eskimos players
Northwestern Wildcats football players
American football running backs
American football halfbacks
1902 births
1963 deaths